The 2007–08 Belgian Hockey League season was the 88th season of the Belgian Hockey League, the top level of ice hockey in Belgium. Six teams participated in the league, and the White Caps Turnhout won the championship.

Regular season

Playoffs

References
Season on hockeyarchives.info

Belgian Hockey League
Belgian Hockey League seasons
Bel